DWED (91.5 FM), broadcasting as 91.5 Brigada News FM, is a radio station owned by Century Broadcasting Network and operated under airtime lease by Brigada Mass Media Corporation. Its studios are located at the 2nd Floor, IDR Bldg., Rizal St., Brgy. Cabangan, Legazpi, and its transmitter is located at the Brgy. Estanza, Legazpi.

History  
The station was inaugurated November 5, 2009, as Magik FM, airing a mass-based format. On October 5, 2012, it rebranded as Radyo Siram and added news and talk to its programming. In September 2015, it rebranded once more as News Rock Radio. In August 2016, Brigada Mass Media Corporation took over the station's operations and was relaunched as Brigada News FM.

References

Radio stations in Legazpi, Albay
Radio stations established in 2007